Mount Hall is a peak rising to   southwest of Mount Weyant in the Asgard Range, Victoria Land. Mount Hall stands close westward of Harris Peak and Ball Peak, with which this naming is associated. It was named by the New Zealand Geographic Board in 1998, after Rob Hall (who died on Mount Everest with A.M. “Andy” Harris), a guide who worked two seasons for the New Zealand Antarctic Research Programme as a field training instructor and, in the 1990s, guided clients (with Gary Ball) on climbs in the Ellsworth Mountains.

References

Mountains of Victoria Land
McMurdo Dry Valleys